Priyanka is a 1994 Indian Tamil-language legal drama film produced and directed by Neelakanta in his debut. A remake of the 1993 Hindi film Damini, it stars Prabhu, Jayaram and Revathi. The film was released on 27 May 1994, and Revathi won numerous awards for her performance, including the Filmfare Award for Best Actress – Tamil.

Plot 
Priyanka is a straightforward person and the daughter of Krishnan, a postmaster. Her father is looking for a groom for her elder sister and herself, but her sister elopes with another man. Shekar, a wealthy businessman, falls in love with Priyanka at first sight. Shekar's father, Sriram, is business partners with Gokulnath, and they decide to arrange a marriage between Shekar and Gokulnath's daughter, Kamini. However, Shekar reveals his love for Priyanka to his family, and they accept it. Shekar and Priyanka get married, but Gokulnath feels betrayed and decides to take revenge on Shekar's family. Priyanka moves into Gokulnath's bungalow.

One day, Priyanka and Shekar witness Shekar's younger brother Vinoth and his friends raping the young maid-servant Ganga. Ganga files a complaint against Vinoth, who is arrested by Ravi, a police officer. However, to save Vinoth, Shekar's family tries to smother the case. Priyanka decides to become the principal witness after seeing Ganga in the hospital, but Shekar's mother orders her to leave the bungalow while Shekar is abroad. Priyanka decides to live with her sister.

The matter goes to court, and Sriram hires Rudrayya, a criminal lawyer who has never lost a case. Shekar asks Priyanka to forget everything and return home, but she refuses. At the court, Rudrayya, Shekar's family, and even Krishnan, Priyanka's father, portray her as a mentally unstable person. As a result, Priyanka is sent to a mental hospital by a judicial order, and Vinoth orders her to be killed. Unable to bear the mental torture in the hospital, Priyanka escapes and runs into Arjun, an alcoholic lawyer, who re-opens the rape case. Later, Ganga dies in the hospital with a suicide note written by Ravi, but Ganga was illiterate. The rest of the story revolves around what transpires next.

Cast 
Prabhu as Arjun
Jayaram as Shekar
Revathi as Priyanka
Jaishankar as Sriram
Nassar as Rudrayya
Nizhalgal Ravi as Ravi
Captain Raju as Gokulnath
Vennira Aadai Moorthy as Susila's brother
Delhi Ganesh as Krishnan
Manjula as Susila
Sachu's Susila's sister-in-law
Sudha as Priyanka's sister

Production 
Priyanka, a remake of the 1993 Hindi film Damini, is the directorial debut of Neelakanta.

Soundtrack 
The soundtrack was composed by Ilaiyaraaja, with lyrics written by Vaali, Pulamaipithan and Mu. Metha. The song "Durga Durga" is set in the Carnatic raga Revati, "Nyabagam Illaiyo" is set in Simhendramadhyamam, and "Vanakkuyile Kuyil" is set in Lalitha.

Release and reception 
Priyanka was released on 27 May 1994. The Indian Express praised Neelakanta's direction, saying that he "displays a lot of confidence in handling the script [..] and the essence of the film is not list" and also praised artistes for "giving very credible and satisfying performances". The Hindu wrote, "The portrayal of [Prabhu] will be the talking point for some time to come". K. Vijiyan of New Straits Times wrote, "Priyanka is saved by good performances by Revathi, [Jayaram], Prabhu and [Nassar] and the drama in the court scenes". T. K. Balaji wrote for Indolink, "Revathi carries off her role with [consummate] ease, as does Prabhu and [Nassar]. Its [Jayaram], who disappoints, as her husband, with a strong Mallu accent. A good screenplay, pleasing score by [Ilaiyaraaja], well scripted and directed by Neelakanta all make for [pleasant] viewing", and praised the absence of a comedy subplot and "over done melodrama". Thulasi of Kalki praised the film's concept and performances of star cast. Independent critics Jaisankar and Sudhakar wrote, "Priyanka is a very serious, but, good movie."

Accolades

References

Bibliography

External links 
 

1990s Tamil-language films
1994 directorial debut films
1994 films
Films about rape in India
Films scored by Ilaiyaraaja
Indian courtroom films
Indian legal drama films
Tamil remakes of Hindi films